Carphochaete grahamii is a species of Mexican  flowering plants in the family Asteraceae. They are native to Durango, Aguascalientes, Guanajuato, Jalisco, México State, Michoacán, and Zacatecas in central and western Mexico.

References

Eupatorieae
Flora of Mexico
Plants described in 1852